Fairwater may refer to:

Fairwater, Cardiff, Wales
Fairwater (Cardiff electoral ward)
Fairwater railway station
Fairwater, Double Bay, a heritage-listed house in Double Bay, Sydney, Australia
Fairwater, Torfaen, Wales
Fairwater, Wisconsin, U.S.A.
, a ship
Sail (submarine), a vertical extension on most submarines that houses the periscopes, masts, and in some cases the conning tower